Prescott is a city in Columbia County, Oregon,  United States. It was named in 1905 for the owner of the local sawmill. The population was 55 at the 2010 census.

Geography

History

Although the nearby community of Rainier was better known as the home of the Trojan Nuclear Power Plant, whose cooling tower was imploded in May 2006, the plant was in fact located less than a mile from Prescott.  Prescott's origin is that of a mill town associated with a large sawmill that was located on the west end town in an area now called Prescott Beach.

The community was named in 1905 for the owners of the mill. A post office was established on May 21, 1907, and ran until May 15, 1946.

Demographics

2010 census
As of the census of 2010, there were 55 people, 26 households, and 18 families residing in the city. The racial makeup of the city was 85% (47 residents) White, 2% (1 resident) African American, 4% (2 residents) Native American, and 9% (5 residents)  from two or more races.

There were 26 households, of which 11.5% had children under the age of 18 living with them, 61.5% were married couples living together, 7.7% had a female householder with no husband present, and 30.8% were non-families. 30.8% of all households were made up of individuals, and 3.8% had someone living alone who was 65 years of age or older. The average household size was 2.12 and the average family size was 2.56.

The median age in the city was 51.5 years. 9.1% of residents were under the age of 18; 1.8% were between the ages of 18 and 24; 25.4% were from 25 to 44; 43.6% were from 45 to 64; and 20% were 65 years of age or older. The gender makeup of the city was 54.5% male and 45.5% female.

2000 census
As of the census of 2000, there were 72 people, 28 households, and 19 families residing in the city. The population density was 1,200.2 people per square mile (463.3/km). There were 33 housing units at an average density of 550.1 per square mile (212.4/km). The racial makeup of the city was 96% White, 1% Native American, and 3% from two or more races. 24% were of German, 11% Finnish, 11% European, 10% American, 10% Norwegian, 8% Swedish and 5% English ancestry according to Census 2000.

There were 28 households, out of which 25.0% had children under the age of 18 living with them, 50.0% were married couples living together, 10.7% had a female householder with no husband present, and 28.6% were non-families. 21.4% of all households were made up of individuals, and 10.7% had someone living alone who was 65 years of age or older. The average household size was 2.57 and the average family size was 2.95.

In the city, the population was spread out, with 26.4% under the age of 18, 4.2% from 18 to 24, 22.2% from 25 to 44, 20.8% from 45 to 64, and 26.4% who were 65 years of age or older. The median age was 44 years. For every 100 females, there were 105.7 males. For every 100 females age 18 and over, there were 96.3 males.

The median income for a household in the city was $40,000, and the median income for a family was $41,563. Males had a median income of $30,357 versus $28,750 for females. The per capita income for the city was $13,773. There were 13.0% of families and 7.4% of the population living below the poverty line, including 14.3% of under eighteens and none of those over 64.

References

External links
Listing for Prescott in the Oregon Blue Book

Cities in Oregon
Cities in Columbia County, Oregon
Oregon populated places on the Columbia River
1905 establishments in Oregon
Populated places established in 1905